

World Championships
The World Road championships will be held in Melbourne, Australia.

Grand Tours

UCI ProTour

Other World Calendar events
These races contribute, along with the Grand Tours and the UCI ProTour races, towards the 2010 UCI World Ranking

2.HC Category Races
The prefix 2 indicates that these events are stage races.

1.HC Category Races
The prefix 1 indicates that these events are one-day races.

National Championships

See also
2010 in women's road cycling

Footnotes

 
Men's road cycling by year